Mária Lebstück (15 August 1831 – 30 May 1892), was a Hussar officer during the Hungarian War of Independence of 1848 and 1849 under the name Károly Lebstück. She was the first woman to have been officer of the Hussar.

Life
She was born into a wealthy Croatian merchant family in Zagreb, and moved to Vienna at the age of 13 to live with her maternal uncle. In November 1848, the revolution erupted in Vienna, and the seventeen-year-old dressed herself as a man and enlisted in the universities regiment. She served in battle during the October revolution in Vienna and after in Hungarian revolution. She was wounded in battle, distinguished herself and was promoted to the rank of an officer.

In July 1849, she married. She was captured while in Budapest and imprisoned. Her husband died in prison, where she gave birth to a son. She was released and banished from Hungary, moving to Croatia In 1853, she returned to Hungary and married one Gyula Pasche in 1851.lived in Komarom until his death in 1870. In 1880, she moved to Újpest with her son, where she died.

Legacy
On 15 March 1935, a memorial plaquet was placed on the house of 4 Ujpest Csokonai. In 1942, she was dramatized in an operetta by Jenő Huszka and László Szilágyi.

References
Hegyaljai Kiss Géza: Lebstück Mária emlékirata 1848 – 49-ből (Hadtörténelmi Közlemények, 1935)
Pálffy Ilona: Nők a magyar függetlenségért (Budapest, 1952)
Jókai Mór: A női honvédhadnagy (Pesti Hírlap, 1892. 20. 22. sz.)

1831 births
1892 deaths
Female wartime cross-dressers
Women in 19th-century warfare
Hussars
Hungarian female military personnel
19th-century Hungarian women
Hungarian Revolution of 1848
People of the Revolutions of 1848
Women in European warfare